Gabriel Tadeu Strefezza Rebelato (born 18 April 1997), sometimes known as Espeto, is a Brazilian professional footballer who plays as a winger for  club Lecce.

Club career

SPAL 
Strefezza was born in Brazil and is of Italian descent. He played for the Corinthians youth teams for 10 years, until moving to SPAL in December 2016. On 31 March 2017 Strefezza made his professional debut for SPAL in Serie B as a substitute replacing Paolo Ghiglione in the 79th minute of a 1–0 away defeat against Avellino. He signed his first professional contract with SPAL on 2 May 2017.

Loan to Juve Stabia 
On 10 July 2017, Strefezza and Tommaso Costantini were signed by Serie C side Juve Stabia on a season-long loan deal. On 30 July, Strefezza made his debut with Juve Stabia and he scored his first professional goal in the 47th minute in a 3–1 home win over Bassano Virtus in the first round of Coppa Italia, he played the entire match. On 23 September, Espeto made his Serie C debut for Juve Stabia as a substitute replacing Filippo Berardi in the 68th minute of a 2–1 away win over Paganese. On 3 October he played his first match as a starter for Juve Stabia in Serie C, a 1–0 away defeat against Bisceglie. On 3 December, he scored his first Serie C goal in the 53rd minute of a 2–2 home draw against Casertana. On 21 January 2018 he played his first entire match for the club, a 1–1 home draw against Catanzaro. On 11 March, he scored his second goal in the league in the 39th minute of a 7–0 home win over Akragas. On 22 April he scored his third goal in the 58th minute of a 3–1 away defeat against Casertana. Strefezza ended his loan to Juve Stabia with 36 appearances, four goals and four assists.

Loan to Cremonese 
On 10 July 2018, Strefezza was loaned to Serie B club Cremonese with an option to buy. On 5 August he made his debut for Cremonese as a substitute replacing Gaetano Castrovilli in the 66th minute of a match lost 4–2 at penalties after a 2–2 draw against Pisa in the second round of Coppa Italia. On 31 August he made his Serie B debut as a substitute replacing Giampietro Perrulli in the 64th minute and in the same minute he scored his first goal for the club. On 23 September, he played his first match as a starter for Cremonese, a 1–1 away draw against Padova, he was replaced by Paulinho in the 60th minute. On 22 December he played his first entire match for the club, a 2–1 home defeat against Carpi. On 10 March 2019, he was sent-off with a double yellow card, as a substitute, in the 91st minute of a 1–0 home win over Benevento. Strefezza ended his loan to Cremonese with 24 appearances and one goal.

Return to SPAL 
Strefezza returned to SPAL for the Serie A 2019/2020 season, making his debut on the pitch as a substitute in the team's third game, and first win, against  Lazio. His contract with the club was renewed the day after, until 30 June 2022. On 21 December 2019 he scored his first goal in Serie A in 2–1 away win against Torino.

Lecce 
On 12 August 2021, he joined Lecce on a permanent basis. He was one of the key figures in the 2021–22 Serie B season, contributing with 14 goals to Lecce’s successful campaign, crowned with the promotion to Serie A.

Career statistics

Club

Honours 
SPAL
 Serie B: 2016–17

Notes

References

External links
 
 
 Sky Sports Profile
 Serie A Profile

1997 births
Living people
Footballers from São Paulo
Brazilian footballers
Brazilian people of Italian descent
S.P.A.L. players
S.S. Juve Stabia players
U.S. Cremonese players
U.S. Lecce players
Serie A players
Serie B players
Serie C players
Brazilian expatriate footballers
Brazilian expatriate sportspeople in Italy
Expatriate footballers in Italy
Association football midfielders
Association football defenders